Gummuluru is a village in West Godavari district in the state of Andhra Pradesh in India. The nearest railway station is Godavari(GVN) located at a distance of 12.41 Km.

Demographics
 India census, Gummuluru has a population of 4346 of which 2176 are males while 2170 are females. The average sex ratio of Gummuluru village is 997. The child population is 397, which makes up 9.13% of the total population of the village, with sex ratio 890. In 2011, the literacy rate of Gummuluru village was 63.56% when compared to 67.02% of Andhra Pradesh.

See also 
 West Godavari district

References 

Villages in West Godavari district